The 2014 European Sambo Championships were held in Bucharest, Romania from May 15 to 19 for men's and women's sport Sambo and the Combat Sambo championships was held in Polyvalent Hall.

Categories 
Combat Sambo: 52 kg, 57 kg, 62 kg, 68 kg, 74 kg, 82 kg, 90 kg, 100 kg, +100 kg
Men's Sambo: 52 kg, 57 kg, 62 kg, 68 kg, 74 kg, 82 kg, 90 kg, 100 kg, +100 kg
Women's Sambo: 48 kg, 52 kg, 56 kg, 60 kg, 64 kg, 68 kg, 72 kg, 80 kg, +80 kg

Medal overview

Combat Sambo Events

Men's Sambo Events

Women's events

Medal table

References

External links 
results

European Sambo Championships
European Sambo Championships, 2014
International sports competitions hosted by Romania
Sports competitions in Bucharest
2014 in sambo (martial art)
May 2014 sports events in Romania